Fish Island is an island on the western shore of Lake Michigan in the eastern part of the town of Washington in Door County, Wisconsin. It was named Fish Island because of the abundance of trout in the area.

Two miles south west of Fish Island, is Fisherman Shoal. It is a small sand bar that surfaces when the water level is low. It is not much more than a few acres in size, but is a navigation hazard.

Diagram

Gallery

References

External links 
 Fish Island, Web-Map of Door County, Wisconsin

Islands of Door County, Wisconsin
Lake islands of Wisconsin
Islands of Lake Michigan in Wisconsin
Uninhabited islands of Wisconsin